Meroda is a genus of leaf beetles in the subfamily Eumolpinae. It is the only member of the tribe Merodini. It is distributed in the state of Amazonas in Brazil.

Species
The genus includes the following species:
 Meroda costata Baly, 1860
 Meroda fulva Baly, 1861
 Meroda rufipennis Baly, 1861

References

Eumolpinae
Chrysomelidae genera
Taxa named by Joseph Sugar Baly
Beetles of South America